Alpheus C. Morse (1818-1893) was an American architect with offices in Providence, Rhode Island.

Life and career
Alpheus Carey Morse was born June 3, 1818, in Boston, Massachusetts to Hazen and Lucy (Cary) Morse. Hazen Morse was a noted silversmith and engraver. He was named for stonecutter Alpheus Cary, his mother's father. He was educated in architecture in the office of Alexander Parris, then one of Boston's leading architects. In 1840 he hoped to gain further experience in the office of Richard Upjohn, then engaged on Trinity Church in New York, and an associate of Parris in 1834. However, Upjohn then did not have space for an additional student. By 1842 he apparently planned to invite him to join his office, though by this time Morse had already left the country to travel abroad. Morse, in the company of Seth Wells Cheney, traveled through Europe for five years, with a home base in Florence at the studio of Horatio Greenough. In Europe Morse devoted much time to painting and crayon portraiture. When he returned to Boston in 1847 he opened a studio on Tremont Row, where he at first continued that same work. His first architectural commission was a church in Haverhill, Massachusetts, his father's native town. About 1851 Morse joined the office of English immigrant architect George Snell, then engaged on the design of Boston Music Hall. Morse was responsible for much of the interior decoration, and the two architects briefly formed a partnership after the building was completed in 1852. However, the firm of Snell & Morse was short-lived, and was dissolved in 1853.

In the same year, Morse was commissioned to design a house in Providence for a close friend, the artist Thomas Frederick Hoppin. This house is and was considered one of the best local examples of Italianate architecture. After that project was completed in 1855, Morse chose to remain in Providence and establish an architectural practice. He formed a partnership with architect Clifton A. Hall, but this too proved short-lived, and Morse & Hall was dissolved in 1856. For the remainder of his career Morse would be a sole practitioner. After the departure from Providence and eventual death of Thomas Alexander Tefft, Morse was the city's leading architect for several years. From 1859 to 1861 he was assisted by Alfred Stone, who himself would become a leader in the profession.

Morse consistently relied on the architecture of the Italian Renaissance as a source for his own work, and was largely dedicated to that style. However, this fell out of favor in his later years, and he transitioned to other styles, including the High Victorian Gothic, Romanesque Revival and Queen Anne. Some of these works were innovative in the local context. Rogers Hall of Brown University, built in 1862, and the Rhode Island Hospital, built in 1864–68, were the first examples of polychrome Gothic architecture in the area, and Sayles Memorial Hall, also at Brown, was one of the area's earliest examples of Richardsonian Romanesque architecture.

Personal life
In 1855 Morse married Caroline Emily Pearce, daughter of Earl Douglas and Lydia (Wheaton) Pearce. The couple moved into the house at 44 Benefit Street, the southern half of a double house built in 1827 by Tallman & Bucklin for the bride's father as an investment. They lived there for the remainder of their lives, raising three daughters. Their eldest, Anne Goddard Morse, was educated as an artist in Boston and New York.

In 1868, Morse was awarded an honorary Master of Arts degree from Brown University. The Brown professors John Larkin Lincoln and George Ide Chace were both his brothers-in-law.

Morse died November 25, 1893, at home in Providence after a brief illness, at the age of 75.

Legacy
In 1857 Morse was a founding member and fellow of the American Institute of Architects, and in 1875 was founding president of the institute's Rhode Island chapter.  He designed many prominent buildings in Providence, including the old Rhode Island Hospital and Sayles Hall on the campus of Brown University. Two of his projects have been listed on the United States National Register of Historic Places, and many others contribute to listed historic districts.

Works
 First Parish Unitarian Church (former), 130 Main St, Haverhill, Massachusetts (1847–48, demolished 2017)
 Interiors of Boston Music Hall (former), 1 Hamilton Pl, Boston, Massachusetts (1852, altered)
 House for Thomas Frederick Hoppin, 383 Benefit St, Providence, Rhode Island (1853–55, NRHP 1973)
 Merchants Bank Building, 20 Westminster St, Providence, Rhode Island (1855–57, NRHP 1977)
 House for William Binney, 72 Prospect St, Providence, Rhode Island (1859)
 House for Henry Albert Rhodes, 101 Benefit St, Providence, Rhode Island (1860–62)
 House for Amos Newell Beckwith, 2 Stimson Ave, Providence, Rhode Island (1861–62)
 House for Smith Owen, 79 Prospect St, Providence, Rhode Island (1861)
 Rogers Hall, Brown University, Providence, Rhode Island (1862)
 Rectory of the Cathedral of St. John (former), 144 Benefit St, Providence, Rhode Island (1863)
 House for Marcy (Mason) Gorham, 34 Benefit St, Providence, Rhode Island (1863–65)
 House for Rufus Waterman, 188 Benefit St, Providence, Rhode Island (1863)
 Rhode Island Hospital (former), 593 Eddy St, Providence, Rhode Island (1864–68, demolished 1956)
 House for James Humphreys, 147 Benefit St, Providence, Rhode Island (1864–66)
 House for William Gorham Angell, 30 Benefit St, Providence, Rhode Island (1864–67)
 Remodeling of house for William Slater, 54 College St, Providence, Rhode Island (1867)
 Fernald Hall, University of Maine, Orono, Maine (1868–70)
 Atlantic Building, 49 Westminster St, Providence, Rhode Island (1869–70, altered 1892 and 1910, demolished 1970)
 Brown Mausoleum, North Burial Ground, Providence, Rhode Island (1869)
 Breck Building, 35 N Main St, Providence, Rhode Island (1870, demolished)
 House for Charles Hutchins Sprague, 17 Arch St, Providence, Rhode Island (1874)
 Double house for Lucian Sharpe, 79 Brown St, Providence, Rhode Island (1874)
  Third Police Station and Wickenden Street Fire Station, 200 and 210 Wickenden St, Providence, Rhode Island (1876, demolished)
 House for William Francis Sayles, 103 Prospect St, Providence, Rhode Island (1878)
 Sayles Memorial Hall, Brown University, Providence, Rhode Island (1879–81)
 House for Henry Truman Beckwith, 68 Brown St, Providence, Rhode Island (1883)
 House for Mary Townsend (Bullock) Ames, 172 Cushing St, Providence, Rhode Island (1884–85)
 Carriage house and stable for Lucian Sharpe, 135 Angell St, Providence, Rhode Island (1885)
 House for Horatio Rogers Jr., 264 Bowen St, Providence, Rhode Island (1887)
 Sundial at Mount Vernon, Fairfax County, Virginia (1887, removed)
 House for William Carey Poland, 53 Lloyd Ave, Providence, Rhode Island (1890)

Gallery

Notes

References

1818 births
1893 deaths
Architects from Providence, Rhode Island
Fellows of the American Institute of Architects
19th-century American architects